Black Power and the American Myth is a 1970 book by C. T. Vivian that analyzes the civil rights movement. Before writing the book, Vivian had been an activist, and a member of the Executive Staff of the Southern Christian Leadership Conference (SCLC), along with Martin Luther King Jr., Andrew Young, James Bevel and others. Besides King, Vivian was the first member of SCLC's staff to write a book about the civil rights movement, and his access gave readers a first-hand account of the thoughts and motivations of the movement's leaders.

Vivian credits King with successfully shifting white Americans' perceptions of the need for equal rights for African-Americans:

Vivian also describes the process through which the movement's leaders identified important goals and strategies:

After its 1970 publication, Black Power and the American Myth became an Ebony Book Club selection and a bestseller.

References 

1970 non-fiction books
American political books
Sociology books
Books about African-American history
Civil rights movement